Front Street may refer to:

 Front Street (Manhattan)
 Front Street (Toronto)
 Front Street (Philadelphia)
 Front Street (Battle Mountain, Nevada)
 Front Street (Juneau, Alaska)
High Street, "Front Street" in some UK and Commonwealth dialects of English, referring to the primary business street of a town